The pifana is a type of gemshorn played in Corsica.  The pifana is generally made from goat horn.

External links
A pifana 

Corsican musical instruments
Vessel flutes